Pliomelaena parviguttata is a species of tephritid or fruit flies in the genus Pliomelaena of the family Tephritidae.

Distribution
Ethiopia.

References

Tephritinae
Insects described in 1952
Diptera of Africa